Leptosciarella pilosa is a species of fly in the family Sciaridae. It is found in the  Palearctic .

References

External links
 Species id

Sciaridae
Insects described in 1840
Taxa named by Rasmus Carl Stæger
Diptera of Europe